Oak Orchard Light was a lighthouse that operated on the shores of Lake Ontario, in New York, United States, at Point Breeze from 1871 to 1916. In 2010 a local community group built a historically accurate replica of the lighthouse near the original site on the east side of Oak Orchard Creek. Originally it had been built at the end of a long wooden pier on the west side.

References

Further reading
 Oleszewski, Wes. Great Lakes Lighthouses, American and Canadian: A Comprehensive Directory/Guide to Great Lakes Lighthouses, (Gwinn, Michigan: Avery Color Studios, Inc., 1998) .
 
 U.S. Coast Guard. Historically Famous Lighthouses (Washington, D.C.: Government Printing Office, 1957).
 Wright, Larry and Wright, Patricia. Great Lakes Lighthouses Encyclopedia Hardback (Erin: Boston Mills Press, 2006)

External links
 Oak Orchard Lighthouse Museum
 
 US-Lighthouses.com

Lighthouses completed in 1871
Lighthouses in New York (state)
Buildings and structures in Orleans County, New York
Museums in Orleans County, New York
Transportation in Orleans County, New York
Lighthouses of the Great Lakes